Paul Schatz (22 December 1898, Konstanz – 7 March 1979) was a German-born sculptor, inventor and mathematician
who patented the oloid and discovered the inversions of the platonic solids, including the "invertible cube", which is often sold as an eponymous puzzle, the Schatz cube.  From 1927 to his death he lived in Switzerland.

External links
Biography of Schatz from Schatz foundation website
Paul Schatz models (in German)
 Hans Dirnböck, Hellmuth Stachel: The Development of the Oloid
About Kaleidocycles, including mention of Schatz cube

1898 births
1979 deaths
People from Konstanz
People from the Grand Duchy of Baden
20th-century Swiss mathematicians
Anthroposophists
20th-century German mathematicians
German emigrants to Switzerland